Bhagmati is a 2005 Indian Hindi-language partly-animation film written and directed by Ashok Kaul, and it is the first Indian film which is almost two-thirds animated, with "live actors" doing the rest.
The film is based on the love story between Prince Mohammad Quli Qutb Shah of Hyderabad and Bhagmati.

Cast
Tabu as Bhagmati
Milind Soman as Mohammad Quli Qutb Shah
J. V. Somayajulu
Mahima Chaudhry (voice)
Hema Malini (cameo)

Soundtrack
"Alvida" - Suresh Wadkar, Sadhana Sargam
"Falsafi O Falsafi" - Ravindra Jain
"Ishq Abhi Tak Zinda Hai" - Farid Sabri, Vinod Sehgal
"Jiya Jaye Amma" - Asha Bhosle, Roop Kumar Rathod
"Kaise Kahan Kab Ho Gaya" - Suresh Wadkar
"Meri Jaan Meri Jaan Meri Jaan Meri Jaan" - Rekha Bhardwaj
"Prem Diwani" - Asha Bhosle
"Suraj Ki Aag Mein" - Roop Kumar Rathod, Sujata Trivedi

See also
 List of Indian animated feature films

External links

References

2005 films
2000s Hindi-language films
Films scored by Ravindra Jain
Films scored by Vishal Bhardwaj
Indian animated films
Indian epic films
Indian historical films
Films about royalty
Cultural depictions of Indian monarchs